The Free Hanseatic City of Bremen, which is one of the states of Germany, is governed by the Senate of the Free Hanseatic City of Bremen. The Senate is chaired by the President of the Senate, who is the head of government of the city-state. The President of the Senate and another member of the senate both hold the title Mayor (Bürgermeister).

List

Free Hanseatic City of Bremen (1945–present) 
President of the Senate and Mayor of Bremen
Political party:

 Mayor, deputy of the President of the Senate

See also
 Timeline of Bremen

Notes

Bremen
Bremen-related lists
Government of Bremen (state)